Localism may refer to:
 Fiscal localism, ideology of keeping money in a local economy
 Local purchasing, a movement to buy local products and services
 Conflict in surf culture, between local residents and visitors for access to beaches with large waves
 The linguistic theory that all grammatical cases, including syntactic cases, are based on a local meaning
 Localism (politics)
 Localism in Hong Kong, a newly emerging political movement in Hong Kong, which strives for the autonomy of Hong Kong
 Localist groups (Hong Kong), related political groups
 Taiwanization, Localism in Taiwan, Taiwanese localization movement
 Pan-Green Coalition, related political groups
 New localism, a concept associated with Tony Blair's Labour government in the United Kingdom

See also  
 Local (disambiguation)
 Localization (disambiguation)